Sir Walter Massy-Greene KCMG (6 November 187416 November 1952) was an Australian politician and businessman. As a Liberal and Nationalist member of the House of Representatives, he became a protégé of Prime Minister Billy Hughes and was groomed as his successor. He served as Minister for Trade and Customs (1919–1921), Defence (1921–1923), and Health (1921–1923), but his prime ministerial aspirations were brought to an abrupt halt by his defeat at the 1922 federal election. Massy-Greene subsequently served two terms as a Senator for New South Wales (1923–1925, 1926–1938), but never regained his earlier influence in politics. In retirement he held numerous company directorships.

Early life
Walter Massy Greene was born on 6 November 1874 in Camberwell, Surrey, England (now part of South London). He was the second son of Julia (née Sandeman) and John Greene, a brewer and hotel proprietor. His maternal grandfather was General Robert Turnbull Sandeman, and his uncle Sir Robert Groves Sandeman was a colonial administrator in India. The family surname was Greene, but at some point Walter chose to treat his middle name as an additional surname; he officially added a hyphen in March 1933.

Greene grew up in Wimbledon before boarding at Lynton House College in Oxfordshire. He was sent to Australia in 1891 for health reasons, and worked as a farm and sawmill labourer in northern Tasmania for a period. He was later joined by his family who took up land near Kyneton, Victoria. In 1895, Greene joined the Bank of New South Wales and was posted to the gold-rush town of Kalgoorlie, Western Australia. After a few years he joined the bank's head office in Sydney, and then was transferred to Lismore, New South Wales. From 1902 he farmed a property near Nimbin with his two brothers. He was elected to the newly created Terania Shire Council in 1906 and chosen as the inaugural shire president.

Politics

Massy-Greene joined the newly created Federal Liberal League in 1909. At the 1910 federal election, he was elected to the Division of Richmond with the support of small farmers. He joined the parliamentary Liberal Party and soon became known for his attacks on the Fisher Government's financial legislation. Massy-Greene retained his seat at the 1913 election, which saw the Liberals win a one-seat majority in the House of Representatives. He was appointed as party whip by Prime Minister Joseph Cook, and subsequently played a key role in maintaining party discipline.

In 1917, following the Australian Labor Party split of 1916, the Liberal Party and the National Labor Party formed a coalition and Massy-Greene became a member of the resultant Nationalist Party. He continued to represent Richmond until 1922 when he was defeated by a Country Party candidate. He was appointed as a Nationalist Party Senator for New South Wales in 1923 and served to the 1925 election, when he was elected to the Senate from July 1926.  He remained in the Senate until his retirement in 1938.

In the fourth Hughes Ministry Massy-Greene was an Honorary Minister in charge of matters relating to price-fixing (27 March 191817 January 1919). He was then promoted to be Minister for Trade and Customs (17 January 191921 December 1921). On 10 March 1921 he became the first Minister for Health, a position he held until 5 February 1923. He then became Minister for Defence until 5 February 1923.

He was relegated to the back bench during the Bruce Ministry. In the First Lyons Ministry he became the minister assisting the Leader of the Government in the Senate (6 January 193223 June 1932) and Assistant Treasurer (6 January 193225 September 1933).

He was appointed a Knight Commander of the Order of St Michael and St George in June 1933, in recognition of his service as Assistant Treasurer. He subsequently formally changed his surname to Massy-Greene to reflect his usage over the previous two decades.

Later life

Business career
In 1936, Massy-Greene became chairman of Associated Pulp and Paper Mills Ltd. on its formation, a post which he held until his death. He was also the chairman of the Emu Bay Railway Company and a director of the Electrolytic Zinc Company, Felt and Textiles of Australia Ltd., Yarra Falls Ltd., and many other companies.

Other activities
During World War II, Massy-Greene served as chairman of the Treasury Finance Committee and as a member of the National Security Capital Issues Advisory Board and Defence Board of Business Administration. In 1940, he led the Australian delegation to the Eastern Group Supply Conference which led to the creation of the Eastern Group Supply Council. Although he never attended university, Massy-Greene also served on the University of Melbourne council from 1939 to 1949, including as deputy chancellor from 1945 to 1947.

Personal life
Massy-Greene married Lula May Lomax in Mungindi, New South Wales on 6 February 1915. The couple had three children together. His son Sir Brian Massy-Greene served as chairman of the Commonwealth Banking Corporation.

After the deaths of George Pearce and Billy Hughes in 1952, Massy-Greene was the sole survivor of the Hughes Nationalist ministries. On 13 November 1952, he was admitted to Freemasons Hospital, Melbourne, where he underwent an operation on his gall bladder the following day. After "progressing satisfactorily" he died on 16 November. A state funeral was held at St John's Anglican Church, Toorak, before a cremation at Springvale Botanical Cemetery.

References

 

Members of the Cabinet of Australia
Members of the Australian House of Representatives for Richmond
Members of the Australian House of Representatives
1874 births
1952 deaths
Commonwealth Liberal Party members of the Parliament of Australia
Nationalist Party of Australia members of the Parliament of Australia
United Australia Party members of the Parliament of Australia
Australian Knights Commander of the Order of St Michael and St George
Australian politicians awarded knighthoods
Members of the Australian Senate
Members of the Australian Senate for New South Wales
Defence ministers of Australia
Australian businesspeople
20th-century Australian politicians
People from Camberwell
English emigrants to colonial Australia
Australian people of Anglo-Irish descent
Australian Ministers for Health
People from Wimbledon, London